Connellys Marsh is a rural locality in the local government area (LGA) of Sorell in the South-east LGA region of Tasmania. The 2021 Census recorded a population of 40 for the state suburb of Connellys Marsh.
It is a small rural community in the Sorell and surrounds region of Tasmania. The shore of Flinders Channel forms the southern boundary.

History 
Connellys Marsh was gazetted as a locality in 1967.

Geography
The waters of Frederick Henry Bay form the southern boundary.

Road infrastructure
The C334 route (Fulham Road) runs west from the Arthur Highway to the locality, passing along the northern boundary on the way to other localities.

References

East Coast Tasmania
Towns in Tasmania
Localities of Sorell Council